The Grinnell College Innovator for Social Justice Prize (Grinnell Prize), created by Grinnell College, is an annual program honoring individuals who have demonstrated leadership in their fields and "who show creativity, commitment, and extraordinary accomplishment in effecting positive social change."

Each year a $50,000 award is given, with half going to the individual and half to their organization.

History of the Grinnell Prize
The Innovator for Social Justice Prize program was announced in November, 2010.

The idea for Innovator for Social Justice Prize originated with Raynard S. Kington, M.D., Ph.D., who began his tenure as Grinnell's thirteenth president in August, 2010. In underscoring the college's longstanding belief in social justice as a core tenet of its liberal arts academic mission, President Kington noted that the prize was created to "encourage and recognize young individuals who embody our core values and organizations that share our commitment to change the world."
 
The program drew more than 1,000 nominations from 66 countries in its initial year.

Nomination criteria
Nominations are evaluated based on how candidates have embraced the values of a liberal arts education, including critical thinking, creative problem-solving, free inquiry and commitment to using and sharing knowledge to better humanity.

In seeking nominations each fall, Grinnell encourages entries from across a wide range of fields, including science, medicine, the environment, humanities, business, economics, education, law, public policy, social services, religion and ethics, as well as projects that cross these boundaries.  Nominations are also encouraged from areas that may not have been traditionally viewed as directly connected to social justice, such as the arts and business. Nominees may be U.S. citizens or nationals of other countries; no affiliation to Grinnell College is required.

Selection committee
Committee members are recognized individuals who work for social change in various capacities – largely Iowa-based – and represent the college's faculty, student body, alumni, staff and trustees, plus prominent individuals not formally affiliated with Grinnell. Current / past committee members have included:

 Marsha Ternus, former chief justice, Iowa Supreme Court
 Eliza Willis, professor of political science, Grinnell College
 Mary Kramer, former Iowa state senator
 George Moose '66, former assistant secretary of state for African affairs

List of winners by year

2011
 Boris Bulayev, president, & Eric Glustrom, executive director, Educate! 
 James Kofi Annan, executive director, Challenging Heights
 Rabbi Melissa Weintraub, co-founder and director emeritus, Encounter

2012
 Cristi Hegranes, founder and executive director, Global Press Institute
 Jacob Wood, co-founder and chief executive officer,& William McNulty, co-founder and managing director, Team Rubicon
 Jane Chen & Linus Liang, co-founders, Embrace

2013
 Emily Arnold-Fernandez, founder and executive director, Asylum Access 
 Elizabeth Scharpf, founder and chief instigating officer, & Julian Ingabire Kayibanda, chief operations officer in Rwanda, SHE (Sustainable Health Enterprises)

2014
 Ani Vallabhaneni & Lindsay Stradley, co-founders, Sanergy
 Adam Kircher & Kiah Williams, co-founders and co-directors, SIRUM (Supporting Initiatives to Redistribute Unused Medicine)

2015
 Deborah Osei-Agyekum, co-founder, Golden Baobab
 Maria Vertkin, founder, Found in Translation

2016
 Luna Ranjit, founder, Adhikaar
 Diana Jue Rajasingh and Jackie Stenson, co-founders, Essmart

2017
 Gina L. Clayton, founder, Essie Justice Group

2018
 Mélanie Marcel, founder, SoScience

2019
 Shafiq R. Khan, founder, Empower People

2020
 Alexander McLean, founder, Justice Defenders

References

External links 
 Official Site
 Grinnell College Website

Grinnell College
Social ethics
Social justice